Dresden is a town in and the county seat of Weakley County, Tennessee, United States. The population was 3,005 at the 2010 census.

Geography
Dresden is located at  (36.283805, -88.698296).

Demographics

2020 census

As of the 2020 United States census, there were 3,019 people, 1,170 households, and 800 families residing in the town.

2000 census
As of the census of 2000, there were 2,855 people, 1,212 households, and 784 families residing in the town. The population density was 537.9 people per square mile (207.6/km2). There were 1,331 housing units at an average density of 250.8 per square mile (96.8/km2). The racial makeup of the town was 94.54% White, 4.34% African American, 0.04% Native American, 0.35% Asian, 0.14% from other races, and 0.60% from two or more races. Hispanic or Latino of any race were 0.46% of the population.

There were 1,212 households, out of which 26.7% had children under the age of 18 living with them, 48.6% were married couples living together, 12.8% had a female householder with no husband present, and 35.3% were non-families. 31.9% of all households were made up of individuals, and 17.3% had someone living alone who was 65 years of age or older. The average household size was 2.22 and the average family size was 2.78.

In the town, the population was spread out, with 20.7% under the age of 18, 9.5% from 18 to 24, 27.7% from 25 to 44, 21.8% from 45 to 64, and 20.3% who were 65 years of age or older. The median age was 39 years. For every 100 females, there were 86.8 males. For every 100 females age 18 and over, there were 84.8 males.

The median income for a household in the town was $26,701, and the median income for a family was $37,321. Males had a median income of $27,589 versus $21,322 for females. The per capita income for the town was $16,286. About 6.4% of families and 10.6% of the population were below the poverty line, including 10.0% of those under age 18 and 16.7% of those age 65 or over.

Education 
Dresden's educational system consists of a combined elementary and middle school, a high school, an alternative school, and a vocational school. The high school was consolidated in 1998 to include students from the neighboring town of Palmersville.

Recreation 
Recreational activities in Dresden include a public park with a walking track, a public library, and a smaller park that is more akin to a public garden. There are a variety of civic clubs, as well as local troops of the Boy Scouts of America and the Girl Scouts. Additionally, a number of summer festivals in neighboring towns are popular with the residents of Dresden (just as the Iris Festival in Dresden is popular with the residents of those towns).

Points of interest
The Dresden Post Office contains a mural, Retrospection, painted in 1938 by Minetta Good. Murals were produced from 1934 to 1943 in the United States through the Section of Painting and Sculpture, later called the Section of Fine Arts, of the Treasury Department.

Notable people 
Lin Dunn, former WNBA coach of Indiana Fever
Emerson Etheridge, Civil War-era congressman and candidate for governor
Roy Herron, Tennessee politician, attorney, and author
Popeye Jones, professional basketball player
Ned McWherter, former Governor of Tennessee
Mike Pyle, mixed martial arts fighter
William D. Vincent, U.S. Representative from Kansas
Matt Beaty, professional baseball player

Climate
The climate in this area is characterized by hot, humid summers and generally mild to cool winters.  According to the Köppen Climate Classification system, Dresden has a humid subtropical climate, abbreviated "Cfa" on climate maps.

References

External links

Official site
Town charter

Towns in Tennessee
Towns in Weakley County, Tennessee
County seats in Tennessee